Lake Oswego High School (LOHS) is a public high school in Lake Oswego, Oregon, United States.

History
Lake Oswego High School first opened in September 1951 as a six-year school, with an enrollment of 564.  In 1956, it became a four-year high school with the opening of Lake Oswego Junior High School, and in 1958, a three-year high school (with 589 students) as the LOJHS expanded to include the 9th grade (for a total of 656 students).

In the fall of 2005, construction was finished on a completely new campus. Built over the original school, the new building featured classrooms equipped with built-in projectors and SMART boards. Other improvements included a state-of-the-art 500-seat theater and a building wing designated for art classes.

Several years later, mold and defects in the walls and roof of the school and gym, as a result of faulty construction, were detected. A string of lawsuits ensued between the school district and parties involved with the construction. The district eventually reached a $6.7 million settlement with its primary contractor, Robinson Construction Company, and several smaller settlements with sub-contractors. Repair work to fix the school's structural problems was completed in 2012.

In 2012, Bruce Plato announced his retirement after 11 years as principal of Lake Oswego High School. The School Board elected Assistant Principal Cindy Schubert as his replacement, effective in the 2013-2014 school year. The current principal is Kristen Colyer.

Academics
In 1983, Lake Oswego High School was honored in the Blue Ribbon Schools Program, the highest honor a school can receive in the United States.

In 2008, 94% of the school's seniors received a high school diplomas. Of 314 students, 294 graduated, 15 dropped out, four received a modified diploma, and one was still in high school in 2009.

The school received a gold ranking in U.S. News & World Reports 2013 "America's Best High Schools". It was named as the second best high school in the state. A gold ranking connotes that the school was among the 500 best in the nation. According to the report, 58 percent of the students participated in AP courses in 2013.

Athletics

Notable alumni

 Terry Bean – pioneering gay rights activist, founder of Human Rights Campaign and the Gay & Lesbian Victory Fund
 Jori Chisholm (1993) - champion bagpiper
 Kari Chisholm (1991) - political consultant
 Santo Condorelli (2013) - Canadian competitive swimmer
 Brett Elliott (2000) - arena football player
 Farnaz Fassihi (1988) - journalist, The New York Times, The Wall Street Journal, author of Waiting for An Ordinary Day
 Mohammad Ashraf Ghani (1967) - former President of Afghanistan He was listed in yearbooks under the name Ashraf Ahmad, and Ashraf Ahmad Zai. The American Field Service sponsored his foreign exchange stay. He served on the student council.
 Karl Glusman (2006) - actor, Nocturnal Animals
 Elijah Greer (2009) - NCAA Champion for Track and Field (2013)
 Bill Hanzlik (1973-1975) - former NBA Player for the Seattle SuperSonics and Denver Nuggets 
 Alexandra Jamieson (1993) - author of The Great American Detox Diet, appeared in the film Super Size Me
 Michael Jones - Internet entrepreneur, investor, and former CEO of Myspace
 Benjamin Kim (2001) - concert pianist and winner of the 55th ARD International Music Competition
 Laz-D - rapper
 Neil Lomax (1977) - former NFL quarterback for the St. Louis Cardinals now Arizona Cardinals
 Kevin Love (2007) - basketball forward for the Miami Heat
 Gabe Miller (2006) - football player, linebacker for the Chicago Bears of the National Football League
 Marissa Neitling (2002) - actress, The Last Ship
 Julianne Phillips (1978) - model and actress
 Don Schollander (1964) - Olympic swimmer
 Tim Solso (1965) - chairman of Cummins Engine Co.
 Katy Steding (1986) - Olympic basketball player
 Salim Stoudamire (2001) - NBA player, Atlanta Hawks
 John Strong - lead Major League Soccer play-by-play television announcer for Fox Sports
 Mike Stutes (2004) - relief pitcher for the Philadelphia Phillies
 Ben Sullivan (basketball) (2002) - basketball player & assistant coach for the Boston Celtics

References

External links
 
 Lake Oswego High School website

Buildings and structures in Lake Oswego, Oregon
High schools in Clackamas County, Oregon
Educational institutions established in 1950
Public high schools in Oregon
1950 establishments in Oregon